The 1871 County Galway by-election was held on 21 February 1871.  The byelection was held due to the resignation of the incumbent Liberal MP, Hubert de Burgh-Canning.  It was won by the unopposed pro Home Rule candidate Mitchell Henry.  The gain was retained in the 1874 general election.

References

1871 elections in the United Kingdom
By-elections to the Parliament of the United Kingdom in County Galway constituencies
Unopposed by-elections to the Parliament of the United Kingdom (need citation)
1871 elections in Ireland